Yousong (有娀) may refer to:
Yousong, a family name called as Song (嵩)
Yousong country, a country name of Jiandi, located at north of Mount Buzhou
Yousong, a ruins of Yousong, located at Puzhou